A list of films produced in Hong Kong in 1989:.

1989

References

External links
 IMDB list of Hong Kong films
 Hong Kong films of 1989 at HKcinemamagic.com

1989
Lists of 1989 films by country or language
1989 in Hong Kong